Rodney Slater may refer to:

Rodney Slater (musician) (born 1941), member of the Bonzo Dog Doo-Dah Band
Rodney E. Slater (born 1955), former United States Secretary of Transportation